Puccinellia phryganodes is a species of grass in the family Poaceae.

It is native to Subarctic to Eastern Canada.

References

phryganodes